Kajaani Church is a church in Kajaani, Finland. It was built in 1896 in the Neo-Gothic style by architect Jac Ahrenberg.

History
The current church replaced an earlier church on the spot which was originally built in 1656 and destroyed by the Russians in 1716 at the time when Kajaani castle was destroyed. The second church was built 1734-35 which served the parish for 160 years until replaced with Ahrenberg's new church.

Architecture
The church, built of wood, has a nave flanked by two aisles and features a delicate, slender bell tower. It is decorated with English Gothic style carvings.

References

Lutheran churches in Finland
Kajaani
Churches completed in 1896
Gothic Revival church buildings in Finland